Blue Rock Creek is a stream in the U.S. state of Ohio.

Blue Rock Creek was so named on account of a blue rock near its mouth.

See also
List of rivers of Ohio

References

Rivers of Morgan County, Ohio
Rivers of Muskingum County, Ohio
Rivers of Ohio